Nomacorc is a producer of engineered synthetic corks for wine bottles. Nomacorc closures use co-extruded technology  to manage the oxygen transfer rate (OTR) needed for wine, protecting against off-flavors in wine due to oxidation, reduction of 2,4,6-trichloroanisole (TCA) commonly known as cork taint.

History 
In 1999, Belgian businessman Gert Noël and his son, Marc Noël, introduced the first Nomacorc closure.

The company is headquartered in Zebulon, North Carolina. In 2001, Nomacorc expanded into the European market with the addition of operations in Eupen, Belgium. In 2003, Nomacorc moved its European headquarters to Thimister-Clermont, Belgium. In January 2008, the company opened a production facility in Yantai, Shandong, China. Nomacorc has plants on three continents, which produce 2 billion corks a year.

Research 
In December 2008, Nomacorc announced the initiation of comprehensive, multiyear projects with the Geisenheim Wine Research Center, UC Davis Department of Viticulture and Enology, Institut National de la Recherche Agronomique (INRA), and the Australian Wine Research Institute (AWRI).

The studies focus on how oxygen transfer through closures influences the evolution of wine after bottling. The studies were set for completion in December 2011.

Leadership 

Marc Noël, Founder 
Lars von Kantzow, CEO

References 

Wine packaging and storage